Tropical Storm Alma of the 2008 Pacific hurricane season was the easternmost forming Pacific tropical cyclone on record. It formed within the monsoon trough just off the coast of Costa Rica on May 29. Alma degenerated into a remnant low on May 30, before merging with another approaching tropical wave in the Gulf of Honduras shortly afterward, which became Tropical Storm Arthur on the next day. Alma was the first tropical storm on record to strike the Pacific coast of Nicaragua. In Costa Rica, heavy rainfall caused flooding and landslides, killing two and causing $35 million (USD) in damage. Three people were killed in Nicaragua, one from drowning and two others from electrocution. Five others died in Honduras from an aviation accident likely related to the storm and one other was swept away in floodwaters.

Meteorological history

Towards the end of May 2008, computer hurricane models forecast the development of a broad low-pressure area to the southwest of Central America. On May 26, a large trough extended from the southwestern Caribbean Sea across Costa Rica into the eastern Pacific Ocean, forming a broad low-pressure area across the region. A scattered area of strong convection developed, partially in association with the Intertropical Convergence Zone. Located within an area of weak steering currents, the disturbance remained nearly stationary, and on May 27 its shower activity increased in organization.

With a mid-level ridge located in the Gulf of Mexico, the depression drifted generally northward through an area of warm water temperatures and low wind shear. Initially its convection was weak and confined to a few rainbands far from the center. As such, intensification was not expected beyond minimal tropical storm status. This marked one of the rare cases in the Eastern Pacific in which a tropical cyclone formed without the involvement of a tropical wave. An eye feature formed, surrounded by a very tight ring of convection, and at around 1900 UTC on May 29, Alma made landfall near León, Nicaragua as a strong tropical storm. The storm quickly weakened after moving ashore, though a small area of thunderstorms persisted as it crossed into the mountainous region of southern Honduras. After passing near Tegucigalpa Alma weakened to tropical depression status, and at 1500 UTC on May 30, the cyclone's low-level lcirculation center dissipated, while the system was situated near the border of Honduras and Guatemala. On May 30, after crossing Central America as a remnant low, Alma's remnants moved into the Gulf of Honduras and merged with another approaching tropical wave from the east, which became Tropical Storm Arthur on the next day.

Preparations and impact

Coinciding with the first advisory on the depression, the government of Costa Rica issued a tropical storm warning for the entire Pacific coast of the country. About four hours prior to landfall, when Alma was named, a tropical storm warning was in effect for the entire coastlines of Costa Rica, Nicaragua, Honduras, and El Salvador. When it was realized the storm was much stronger than previously thought, a hurricane warning was issued for the coasts of Nicaragua and Honduras, and Alma was forecast to attain hurricane status. The National Emergency Commission of Costa Rica activated emergency shelters prior to the arrival of the storm; 250 people in Parrita evacuated from their homes. In Nicaragua, officials evacuated about 5,000 people, while 3,000 troops were mobilized to assist in the aftermath of the storm.

When Tropical Storm Alma made landfall, it produced moderate to heavy rainfall across Central America. The city of David, Chiriquí in western Panama reported  of precipitation in 48 hours. Additionally, the capital city of San José, Costa Rica reported  of rainfall in a 48‑hour period. In Costa Rica, the precipitation caused river flooding, threatening 17 communities. It also caused widespread mudslides, which closed at least eight roads. The storm downed trees and power lines, leaving about 42,000 people without electricity in the country. Two deaths were reported in the country, and damage in Costa Rica was estimated at ₡20 billion colónes ($35 million 2008 USD).

In León near where it moved ashore in Nicaragua, the passage of Alma left the city without power. Several buildings were destroyed in the city, and some roads were damaged. Much of the departments of León and Chinandega experienced power outages, due to the strong winds. One person died from electrocution, due to a downed high-tension cable, and another person died in a similar manner. Offshore, one person drowned when he rode out the storm in his boat. In Tegucigalpa, TACA Flight 390 skidded off a runway sodden by torrential rain, killing three passengers (plus two more on the ground) and injuring over eighty. One other fatality was reported in Honduras when a young girl was swept away in a raging stream.

Records and retirement

Forming at 86.5ºW, Alma developed farther east than any other Pacific tropical cyclone on record. Excluding systems crossing in from the Atlantic, only eight other systems, Francesca in 1970, Bridget and Priscilla in 1971, Jimena in 1979, Paul in 1982, Cristina in 1996, Rosa in 2000, and Selma in 2017, developed east of 90ºW. Alma made landfall farther east than any other Pacific tropical cyclone, and it was the only to do so on the Pacific coast of Nicaragua. When the storm formed on May 29, it marked the ninth year in a row when a Pacific tropical cyclone formed in May, which was the most consecutive years in which storms formed in May. Alma's remnants contributed to the formation of Tropical Storm Arthur in the Atlantic.

Despite having a relatively minimal impact on land, the World Meteorological Organization retired the name Alma from the list of Pacific hurricane names and replaced it with Amanda for the 2014 Pacific hurricane season. This makes Alma one of only three tropical storms to have had its name retired in the eastern Pacific; the others were Hazel in 1965 and Knut in 1987.

See also

 List of Pacific hurricanes
 Timeline of the 2008 Pacific hurricane season
 List of retired Pacific hurricanes
 Tropical Storm Allison - The first tropical storm to have its name retired in the Atlantic
 Tropical Storm Selma (2017)

References

2008 Pacific hurricane season
Eastern Pacific tropical storms
Retired Pacific hurricanes
Hurricanes in Costa Rica
Hurricanes in Nicaragua
Hurricanes in Honduras
Tropical Storm Alma
Tropical Storm Alma
Alma